Count , was an admiral in the Imperial Japanese Navy. Kawamura's wife Haru was the aunt of Saigō Takamori.

Biography
A native of Satsuma, Kawamura studied navigation at Tokugawa bakufu naval school at Nagasaki, the Nagasaki Naval Training Center. In 1868, he joined his Satsuma clansmen, and fought on the imperial side in the Boshin War of the Meiji Restoration as an army general. He was especially noted for his role in the Battle of Aizu-Wakamatsu.

Under the new Meiji government, he became an officer in the fledgling Imperial Japanese Navy, and steadily rose through the ranks. He became first Director of the Imperial Japanese Naval Academy in 1870 and taifu (senior vice minister) of Navy in 1872. He was in command of Japanese naval forces during the Taiwan Expedition of 1874.

During the Satsuma Rebellion, he was placed in command of all Imperial troops in September 1877 at the final Battle of Shiroyama near Kumamoto, when Saigō Takamori was killed (or committed seppuku). This battle, Saigō's last stand against the Meiji government, was the historical basis for the 2003 film The Last Samurai.

In 1878, Kawamura became sangi (councillor) and the second Navy Minister. He remained in that position until 1885 except when he was temporarily replaced by Enomoto Takeaki, and during that period he expanded the influence of people from Satsuma within the navy.

In 1884, he was ennobled with the title of hakushaku (count) under the kazoku peerage system. Later serving as court councillor and Privy Councillor, in 1901 he was given responsibility for the upbringing of the newborn Prince Michi (the future Emperor Hirohito) and his younger brother Prince Chichibu (Yasuhito).

In 1904, Kawamura was posthumously appointed to the rank of admiral, setting a precedent for such honors. His cause of death remains unknown, setting a mystery.

References

Books

Notes

External links
Kawamura Sumiyoshi at the Imperial Japanese Navy website

1836 births
1904 deaths
Imperial Japanese Navy admirals
People from Satsuma Domain
Kazoku
People of the Boshin War
People of Meiji-period Japan
Shimazu retainers
People of the Satsuma Rebellion